Greer High School is a public high school in Greer, South Carolina, United States. With about 1200 students, Greer High is a moderate sized school in Greenville County, South Carolina.

Curriculum
Greer High School offers the International Baccalaureate program.

References

External links
 Greer High School website
 Greer High School sports
 School District website
 Program Report for Fiscal Year 2007-08
 History of Greer High School. 2009.

Public high schools in South Carolina
International Baccalaureate schools in South Carolina
Schools in Greenville County, South Carolina
1895 establishments in South Carolina